The 1993–94 season saw Rochdale compete in their 20th consecutive season in the fourth tier of the English football league, named at the time as the Football League Third Division.

Statistics
																												
																												

|}

Final League Table

Competitions

Football League Third Division

F.A. Cup

Football League Cup (Coca-Cola Cup)

Football League Trophy (Autoglass Trophy)

Lancashire Cup

References

Rochdale A.F.C. seasons
Rochdale